is a tram station operated by Toei's  Tokyo Sakura Tram located in Arakawa, Tokyo Japan. It is 0.6 kilometres from the terminus of the Tokyo Sakura Tram at Minowabashi Station.

Layout
Arakawa-kuyakushomae Station has two opposed side platforms.

Surrounding area
 Arakawa City Hall
 Arakawa Post Office
 Arakawa Fire Station

History
 April 1, 1913: Station opened

Railway stations in Tokyo
Stations of Tokyo Toden
Railway stations in Japan opened in 1913